The Down Senior Hurling Championship (known for sponsorship reasons as the Morgan Fuels Down GAA Senior Hurling Championship and abbreviated to the Down SHC) is an annual hurling competition contested by top-tier Down GAA clubs. The Down County Board of the Gaelic Athletic Association has organised it since 1903.

Ballycran are the title holders (2021) defeating Portaferry in the Final after extra time.

History

Faugh-a-Ballagh won the inaugural Down SHC in 1903.

The competition has been won by 10 teams, 9 of which have won it more than once. Ballycran is the most successful team in the tournament's history, having won it 27 times. No team outside Ballycran, Portaferry and Ballygalget have won the title since Kilclief's 23rd victory in 1956.

Format

Introduced in 1903 as the Down Senior Hurling Championship, it was initially a straight knockout tournament open only to senior-ranking club teams, with its winner reckoned as the Down county champion. In its present format, four clubs play each other in a double round-robin system. The competition winner is determined through a group and knockout format. The top two teams proceed to the final match.

Honours

The Jeremiah McVeagh Cup is the current prize for winning the championship. It was presented by nationalist Member of Parliament Jeremiah McVeagh to the Down County Board in 1913 and has been presented to the championship winners ever since..

Traditionally, depending on the venue, the victory presentation takes place at a special rostrum in the main grandstand or on a podium on the pitch. The cup is decorated with ribbons in the colours of the winning team. During the game the cup actually has both teams' sets of ribbons attached and the runners-up ribbons are removed before the presentation. The winning captain accepts the cup on behalf of his team before giving a short speech. Individual members of the winning team then have an opportunity to come to the rostrum to lift the cup, which is held by the winning team until the following year's final. 

In accordance with GAA rules, the County Board awards a set of gold medals to the championship winners.

The winners of the Down Senior Championship, as well as being presented with the Jeremiah McVeagh Cup, qualify to represent their county in the subsequent Ulster Senior Club Hurling Championship.

List of finals
(r) = replay  (aet) = after extra time

Notes
† The 1962 final was abandoned.

Wins listed by club

Records and statistics

Final

Team

Most wins: 27:
Ballycran: (1949, 1953, 1957, 1958, 1960, 1961, 1967, 1972, 1974, 1976, 1977, 1979, 1980, 1984, 1985, 1986, 1987, 1993, 1994, 1995, 2007, 2009, 2011, 2015, 2018, 2019, 2021.
Most consecutive wins: 9:
Kilclief: (1912, 1913, 1914, 1915, 1916, 1917, 1918, 1919, 1920)

Teams

By decade

The most successful team of each decade, judged by number of Down Senior Hurling Championship titles, is as follows:

 1900s: 5 for Faugh-a-Ballagh (1903-04-07-08-09)
 1910s: 8 for Kilclief (1912-13-14-15-16-17-18-19)
 1920s: 2 each for Kilclief (1920-25), Portaferry (1926-29) and Liatroim Fontenoys (1927–28)
 1930s: 5 for Kilclief (1931-32-33-35-39)
 1940s: 5 for Kilclief (1942-43-44-45-47)
 1950s: 3 for Ballycran (1953-57-58) and Kilclief (1954-55-56)
 1960s: 4 for Portaferry (1963-65-68-69)
 1970s: 5 for Ballycran (1972-74-76-77-79)
 1980s: 5 for Ballycran (1980-84-85-86-87)
 1990s: 5 for Ballygalget (1990-92-97-98-99)
 2000s: 4 each for Portaferry (2000-01-02-06) and Ballygalget (2003-04-05-08)
 2010s: 4 each for Ballygalget (2010-13-16-17) and Ballycran (2011-15-18-19)

Gaps

Longest gaps between successive championship titles:
 25 years: Portaferry (1938–1963)
 21 years: Faugh-a-Ballagh (1909–1930)
 12 years: Clann Uladh (1934–1946)

References

External links
 Official Down Website
 Down Club GAA

 
Down GAA club championships
Hurling competitions in Northern Ireland
Hurling competitions in Ulster
Senior hurling county championships